Reign Total Body Fuel is an American energy drink that was introduced in 2019 by the Monster Beverage Corporation. It is available in 16 flavors.

History
In 2019, VPX Sports filed a lawsuit against Monster Beverage for infringing on their trademark. In 2021, Monster won the trade dress lawsuit.

In 2020, Monster Beverage request to block VPX Sports from using the word Reign was preliminarily granted.

In 2021, the talent agency Viral Nation partnered with Reign, along with other brands, for Anthony Hamilton Jr.

References

External links
 

Energy drinks
Products introduced in 2019